Corchado is a surname. Notable people with the surname include:

Alfredo Corchado, Mexican-American journalist and author
José Ramón Corchado (born 1957), Spanish footballer
Manuel Corchado y Juarbe (1840–1884), Puerto Rican poet, journalist and politician 
Martín Corchado (1839–1898), Puerto Rican physician